Portentomorpha is a genus of moths of the family Crambidae. It contains only one species, Portentomorpha xanthialis, which is found from Texas to Louisiana and Florida, the West Indies (including Cuba, Puerto Rico) and from Mexico to Bolivia (including Colombia and Ecuador).

The wingspan is 24–27 mm. Adults have been recorded on wing in August in Florida.

Portentomorpha is the type genus of the tribe Portentomorphini, established by Hans Georg Amsel in 1956.

References

Pyraustinae
Crambidae genera
Monotypic moth genera
Moths of North America
Moths of South America
Lepidoptera of the Caribbean
Taxa named by Hans Georg Amsel